Abu Mosheyleysh (also Romanized as Abū Mosheyleysh, Aboo Meshilesh, and Abū Mashīlīsh) is a village in Muran Rural District, in the Soveyseh District of Karun County, Khuzestan Province, Iran. At the 2006 census, its population was 208, in 41 families.

References 

Populated places in Karun County